Erwin Koffi (born 10 January 1995) is a professional footballer who plays as a  right-back for Ligue 2 club Pau FC. Born in France, Koffi was a youth international for the Ivory Coast.

Club career
On 14 May 2016, Koffi made his Ligue 1 debut against Gazélec Ajaccio.

International career
Born in France and of Ivorian descent, Koffi represented the Ivory Coast U23s in a 2–0 friendly defeat to Burkina Faso U23 on 31 August 2016.

Career statistics

Club

References

External links

1995 births
Living people
Ivorian footballers
Ivorian expatriate footballers
Footballers from Paris
Association football defenders
Citizens of Ivory Coast through descent
Ivory Coast under-20 international footballers
French footballers
French sportspeople of Ivorian descent
LB Châteauroux players
FC Lorient players
Anorthosis Famagusta F.C. players
Olympiakos Nicosia players
Pau FC players
Ligue 1 players
Ligue 2 players
Cypriot First Division players
Ivorian expatriate sportspeople in Cyprus
Expatriate footballers in Cyprus